Frascati may refer to:

 Frascati, a town of central Italy.
 Frascati, a neighbourhood in Warsaw, Poland.
 Frascati (wine), a white wine from that Italian region.
 Frascati (Somerset, Virginia), a 19th-century plantation.
 Frascati Manual, a document stipulating the methodology for collecting and using statistics about research and development.
 Roman Catholic Suburbicarian Diocese of Frascati, Roman Catholic titular see